The Bear Family & Me is a three-part nature documentary series produced by the BBC Natural History Unit. It follows wildlife cameraman Gordon Buchanan as he spends a year with a family of wild black bears, under the guidance of biologists Lynn Rogers and Sue Mansfield of the North American Bear Centre.

Episodes

References

External links
 
 
 The Bear Family and Me on Eden

2011 British television series debuts
2011 British television series endings
2010s British documentary television series
BBC television documentaries
Nature educational television series
Television shows set in North America
English-language television shows